Vitis betulifolia is a widely ranging species of liana in the grape family native to China (found in Gansu, Henan, Hubei, Hunan, Shaanxi, Sichuan and Yunnan provinces) where its habitat is forested or shrubby valleys and hillsides, at elevations from .

V. betulifolia has rather long intervals for both flowering (March — June) and fruiting (June — November), bearing globose, blackish-purple berries.

Although there may be no vernacular English name for this species, the Chinese name is hua ye pu tao, which translates to "birch-leaf grape". Both the Latin word used for the epithet (betulifolia) and the Chinese hua ye mean "birch leaf".

External links
Plants of the World Online: Vitis betulifolia
Flora of China: Vitis betulifolia
Global Biodiversity Information Facility: Vitis betulifolia
International Plant Names Index: Vitis betulifolia
Vitis betulifolia (Birch-Leaf Grape)

References

betulifolia

Flora of China